The Ethiopian Broadcasting Corporation (EBC), now rebranded as ETV (stylized in all lowercase), is an Ethiopian government-owned public service broadcaster. It is headquartered in Addis Ababa, Ethiopia, and is the country's oldest and largest broadcaster.

EBC was established by order of Emperor Haile Selassie and initially operated by Thomson, a British firm. It is fully owned by the Ethiopian government. Its programming includes news, sport, music and other entertainment. The majority of the programming is broadcast in Amharic, one of the five official languages of Ethiopia. Some news segments are broadcast in other languages, such as Oromo, Somali, Tigrinya, Afar, Gurage, and English.

EBC has entertainment programs like Ethiopian Idol, which features similar content to American talent show American Idol. In recent years, ETV has transmitted a few matches a week from European Football Leagues (Spanish La Liga and English Premier League), plus some international matches. EBC transmits its programmes on 4 satellite stations.

History 
Ethiopian Television was initially established during Haile Selassie reign era in 1962 with assistance from the British firm, Thomson. Regular transmission began on 2 November 1964. It was created to highlight the Organization of African Unity (OAU) meeting that took place in Addis Ababa that same year. Color television started on a experimental basis in 1979, with regular colour transmissions beginning in 1984 in commemoration of the founding of Workers' Party of Ethiopia (WPE). The current structure and goals of were established 1987 with Proclamation 114/87. In 1995 ERTA(Ethiopian Radio and Television Agency) was created in as the result of the merge between the Ethiopian Radio and the ETV (Ethiopian Television). In 2014, the channel changed its name from ETV to EBC, also changing its logo in the process. In 2015, EBC and other regional channels upgraded their news studios with more modern equipment. In March 2018, EBC's logo was transferred to etv and made a new transmission of frequency and sister's channel contents and it is now broadcasting on Ethiosat and Nilesat.

During the 2022 FIFA World Cup, FIFA accused EBC of pirating a large number of matches and threatened to permanently withdraw its broadcasting rights. EBC claimed that it was granted the broadcasting rights for all matches, while FIFA claimed it gave a warning before.

Facebook page hacking incident 
Ethiopian Broadcasting Corporation's official Facebook page was hacked and deleted on 4 October 2021. It also ensued losing 2 million followers. The Ministry of Technologies said that they are working to restore the page. EBC later restored its Facebook account within weeks.

TV channels

ETV News HD 
ETV News (etv ዜና) is the main news channel with 24 hours coverage, with content on culture, politics, documentaries, and economy. Broadcast mostly in Amharic with the exception of some news segments which are broadcast in other languages. ETV News (etv ዜና) is the main news channel with 24 hours coverage, with content on culture, politics, documentaries, and economy.

ETV Languages HD 
ETV Languages is a channel which focuses on news in the varied languages of Ethiopia along with 3 international languages.

ETV Entertainment HD 
ETV Entertainment (ETV መዝናኛ) is a channel which focuses on dramas, as well as lifestyle programming. The channel is most known for broadcasting Ethiopian first family sitcom, Betoch. This channel also airs a lot of popular foreign content including soap operas and Hollywood films.

ETV Sport 
ETV Sport only focuses on broadcasting sport matches and highlights of the English Premier League, European leagues, the Ethiopian Premier League and other international sport tournament's.

ETV Representative 
ETV Representative was a channel that focused on Parliament news and other live stream.(Closed)

ETV Afan Oromo 
ETV Afan Oromo is a channel that focuses on news, sports, and entertainment in Oromo.

ETV Yelijochalem 
ETV Yelijochalem is a channel that focuses on childrens programming.

Logos

Radio stations 

 Fana FM 90.0
 Awash FM 90.7
 Debub FM 91.6
 Ethiopian National Radio 93.1
 Ahadu FM 94.3
 FM Addis 97.1

 Civil Services FM 100.5
 Bisrat FM 101.1
 Sheger FM 102.1
 Tsedey FM 102.9
 EBC FM 104.7
 
 Ethio FM 107.8
 Jimma Fana FM 98.1

Other subsidiary media organizations 
 OBN (Oromiyaa Broadcast Network)
 Addis TV
 Amhara TV
 Tigray TV
 Somali TV
 Dire TV
 Debub TV
 Harar TV
 Afar TV

References

External links

Ethiopian Media Authority
Ethiopian Radio and Television Agency
Ethiopian Live TV - EBC

Television in Ethiopia
Television channels in Ethiopia
Television networks
Television channels and stations established in 1962
Radio stations established in 1935
Publicly funded broadcasters